The canton of Brassac-les-Mines is an administrative division of the Puy-de-Dôme department, central France. It was created at the French canton reorganisation which came into effect in March 2015. Its seat is in Brassac-les-Mines.

It consists of the following communes:
 
Antoingt
Anzat-le-Luguet
Apchat
Ardes
Augnat
Auzat-la-Combelle
Bansat
Beaulieu
Bergonne
Boudes
Brassac-les-Mines
Le Breuil-sur-Couze
Chalus
Champagnat-le-Jeune
La Chapelle-Marcousse
La Chapelle-sur-Usson
Charbonnier-les-Mines
Chassagne
Collanges
Dauzat-sur-Vodable
Égliseneuve-des-Liards
Esteil
Gignat
La Godivelle
Jumeaux
Lamontgie
Madriat
Mareugheol
Mazoires
Moriat
Nonette-Orsonnette
Parentignat
Peslières
Les Pradeaux
Rentières
Roche-Charles-la-Mayrand
Saint-Alyre-ès-Montagne
Saint-Étienne-sur-Usson
Saint-Genès-la-Tourette
Saint-Germain-Lembron
Saint-Gervazy
Saint-Hérent
Saint-Jean-en-Val
Saint-Jean-Saint-Gervais
Saint-Martin-d'Ollières
Saint-Martin-des-Plains
Saint-Quentin-sur-Sauxillanges
Saint-Rémy-de-Chargnat
Sauxillanges
Sugères
Ternant-les-Eaux
Usson
Valz-sous-Châteauneuf
Varennes-sur-Usson
Le Vernet-Chaméane
Vichel
Villeneuve

References

Cantons of Puy-de-Dôme